Asia Muhammad (born April 4, 1991) is an American professional tennis player. 
A doubles specialist, Muhammad has won eight doubles titles on the WTA Tour, four doubles titles on WTA Challenger Tour as well as 13 singles and 35 doubles titles on the ITF Circuit. She has reached a WTA 1000 final, at the 2022 Indian Wells Open with Ena Shibahara, and the semifinals of a major, at the 2020 US Open, partnering with Taylor Townsend.

Early career and coaching
Muhammad is coached by NCAA champion Tim Blenkiron, owner of the NO QUIT Tennis Academy where Asia trains. Blenkiron started coaching her when she was a child in Andre Agassi’s TEAM AGASSI tennis and education program in Las Vegas where she developed into one of the best junior players in the world. Her first big break was reaching the finals of the Tennis Channel Open at the age of 16. Asia is a famed alumni and board member of the Inspiring Children Foundation and their Team Bryan program, co-created by tennis legends Bob and Mike Bryan, Ryan Wolfington and Tim Blenkiron. Her favorite surface is the hardcourt.

Personal life
Her younger brother Shabazz Muhammad played for five seasons in the NBA, played for the Shanxi Brave Dragons in the Chinese Basketball Association and most recently played for the San Miguel Beermen in the Philippines. She is the niece of former Kansas City Chiefs and Minnesota Vikings receiver Stephone Paige.
Asia was born in Long Beach, California, to Ron Holmes and Faye Muhammad. Her father was a 6-foot-5-inch (1.96 m) standout, four-year starting point guard for the USC Trojans men's basketball program in the 1980s. Muhammad's mother, Faye, was a point guard and track star at Long Beach State.

Performance timelines

Singles

Doubles

Mixed doubles

Significant finals

WTA 1000 tournaments

Doubles: 1 (runner-up)

WTA career finals

Doubles: 10 (8 titles, 2 runner-ups)

WTA Challenger finals

Doubles: 7 (4 titles, 3 runner-ups)

ITF Circuit finals

Singles: 17 (13 titles, 4 runner-ups)

Doubles: 54 (35 titles, 19 runner-ups)

World TeamTennis
Muhammad has played two seasons with the WTT debuting in 2012 with the Sacramento Capitals. In 2019, she was the first-even draft selection by the Vegas Rollers and played a full season with the expansion team. She was set to rejoin her hometown team during the 2020 season set to begin July 12.

Notes

References

External links
 
 

1991 births
Living people
Tennis players from Long Beach, California
African-American female tennis players
American female tennis players
Tennis people from Nevada
21st-century African-American sportspeople
21st-century African-American women